The 36th Edition Vuelta a España (Tour of Spain), a long-distance bicycle stage race and one of the three grand tours, was held from 21 April to 10 May 1981.

Regis Clere won the prologue of the race and kept the leader's jersey until the mountain time trial where on the very long climb to Sierra Nevada, Giovanni Battaglin won the stage and took over the leader's jersey. The only threat to Battaglin's lead was Pedro Muñoz.
The entire Teka team withdrew from the race withdrawing potential favourites Marino Lejarreta and Alberto Fernández. Battaglin and his Inoxpran team withstood the challenge from the Spanish and brought Battaglin to his first grand tour victory. Three days later after Battaglin's triumph in Spain, he began the 1981 Giro d'Italia which he would win becoming the second rider after Eddy Merckx to win the Vuelta-Giro double.

Teams and riders

Route

Final standings

General classification

Team classification

Points classification

Mountains classification

Sprints classification

References
General

Specific

 
1981 in road cycling
1981
1981 in Spanish sport
April 1981 sports events in Europe
May 1981 sports events in Europe
1981 Super Prestige Pernod